The 1963 Ohio Bobcats football team was an American football team that represented Ohio University in the Mid-American Conference (MAC) during the 1963 NCAA University Division football season. In their sixth season under head coach Bill Hess, the Bobcats won the MAC championship, compiled a 6–4 record (5–1 against MAC opponents), and outscored all opponents by a combined total of 135 to 103.  They played their home games in Peden Stadium in Athens, Ohio.

The team's statistical leaders included Jim Albert with 707 rushing yards, Wes Danyo with 635 passing yards, and Jim Albert with 186 receiving yards. Jim Albert also set a school record with a 95-yard interception return against Western Michigan.

Schedule

References

Ohio
Ohio Bobcats football seasons
Mid-American Conference football champion seasons
Ohio Bobcats football